Arivaca albidella is a species of snout moth described by George Duryea Hulst in 1900. It is found in the Southwestern United States.

References

Moths described in 1900
Anerastiini
Moths of North America